The Roman Catholic Diocese of Criciúma is a diocese located in the city of Criciúma in the Ecclesiastical province of Florianópolis in Brazil.

History
 27 May 1998: Established as Diocese of Criciúma from the Diocese of Tubarão

Bishops
 Bishops of Criciúma (Roman rite)
 Paulo Antônio de Conto (27 May 1998 – 2 July 2008)
 Jacinto Inácio Flach (16 September 2009 – present)

Other priest of this diocese who became bishop
Onécimo Alberton, appointed Bishop of Rio do Sul, Santa Catarina

References
 GCatholic.org
 Catholic Hierarchy
 Diocese website (Portuguese)

Roman Catholic dioceses in Brazil
Christian organizations established in 1998
Criciúma, Roman Catholic Diocese of
Roman Catholic dioceses and prelatures established in the 20th century